Born Shri Beli Ram Ji, Shri Swami Swarupanand Ji Maharaj (1 February 1884 – 9 April 1936), was an Indian Guru of Shri Paramhans Advait Mat lineage. He is also known as "Shri Nangli Niwasi Bhagwaan Ji", as "Hari Har Baba", as "Sadhgurudev Ji"  and as "Second Guru". Born in village Teri in Kohat district, India (now in Pakistan), the young Beli Ram Ji was initiated into the sanyasas in the early 1900s in Teri by Shri Paramhans Swami Advaitanand Ji, who named him Shri Swami Swarupanand Ji. During Swami Advaitanand ji's life, Swami Swarupanand ji created an order of sanyasis (or renunciates) in northern India and founded several centers with the purpose of disseminating his master's teachings.

Shri Swami Advaitanand Ji Maharaj asked him to meditate in Agra, with the object to preserve the spiritual power to be utilised in future as the reformer of the spiritual Age. Far away from town in a jungle under the Neem tree the Second Guru, absorbed in his own ecstasy, roamed in quite a different world in a gufa (a very tight cave 3–4 feet under the land). Many residents of Agra, who were totally unaware of his name and whereabouts, felt attracted by him and placed some eatables near his seat with a thought he might accept them. But the Yogeshwar, the Second Guru, had no affinity for eating/drinking. He used to eat only boiled neem leaves and as such his divine body reduced to skeleton after 14 years of meditation at that place. A temple has been made around the cave in Agra as is known as Tapobhoomi. Shri Paramhans Swami Advaitanand Ji declared Swami Swarupanand Ji Maharaj as his spiritual successor. Chakauri ashram, (now in Gujrat, Pakistan) a beautiful shrine of pilgrimage built in Punjab at the cost of lakhs of rupees remained the congregational headquarters of Swami Swarupanand Ji Maharaj.

In 1935, he announced his decision to leave Punjab and settle in Uttar Pradesh in the presence of 800 saffron clads Mahatmas and thousands of householder devotees which caused a wave of agony among the gathering. In 1936, he visited Delhi for the last time and stayed there for two months. Leaving behind large Ashrams in the Frontier, Sindh and Punjab, he moved to Nangli village, near Meerut in March, 1936. He proclaimed : “I’ve got four ‘Rotis’ with me. One is meant for Punjab, another one for Gwalior and two for Nangli here, as this place is very close to my heart."

He left this world a year later on 9 April 1936 in the village of Nangli, near Meerut. Shri Swami Nijatmanand Ji and Swami Abhedanand Ji gave Samadhi to the sacred body at Shri Nangli Sahib as per his testaments in which Sadgurudev Ji had expressed his wish to remain in Shri Nangli Sahib. At the time of his death, Shri Swami Swarupanand Ji Maharaj had more than 10,000 followers and more than 300 ashrams in northern India. Nangli Tirath (Nangli Sahib) village in Meerut District and is few kilometers off the Delhi-Haridwar Highway. It houses the holiest samadhi (grave) of Satguru Shri Swami Swarupanand Ji Maharaj, who sanctified the village by his visit. The path from the main road to the teerth has 84 turns on it, which symbolizes the mukti (salvation) through eighty four lakh yonis. His disciple Shri Paramhans Swami Ramanand Satyarthi Ji Maharaj went on to establish Paramhans Satyarthi Mission .Paramhans Satyarthi Mission is a renowned institute that stands as an epitome of Gurudev’s sublime aura. The patron of this spiritual institute since 2 July 1985 is Swami Keshwanand Satyarthi Ji Maharaj, who was born as a younger son to Shri Swami Ramanand Satyarthi Ji Maharaj. One of the disciples of Shri Swarupanand Ji Maharaj was Hans Ji Maharaj, who went on to establish the Divine Light Mission. According to another account, Shri Swami Swarupanand Ji Maharaj was succeeded by Shri Swami Vairagya Anand Ji Maharaj, also known as the third master of Shri Anandpur.

Swami Swarupanand Ji Maharaj is sometimes confused with Anand Swarup of the Radha Soami lineage.

References

1884 births
1936 deaths
People from Kohat District
Advait Mat gurus
20th-century Hindu philosophers and theologians
Indian Hindu saints